Pharaoh (Egyptian: pr ꜥꜣ; ; Biblical Hebrew:  Parʿō) is the vernacular term often used by modern authors for the kings and queens of ancient Egypt who ruled as monarchs from the First Dynasty (c. 3150 BC) until the annexation of Egypt by the Roman Empire in 30 BC. However, regardless of gender, "king" was the term used most frequently by the ancient Egyptians for their monarchs through the middle of the Eighteenth Dynasty during the New Kingdom. The earliest confirmed instances of "pharaoh" used contemporaneously for a ruler were a letter to Akhenaten (reigned c. 1353–1336 BC) or an inscription possibly referring to Thutmose III (c. 1479–1425 BC).

In the early dynasties, ancient Egyptian kings had as many as three titles: the Horus, the Sedge and Bee (nswt-bjtj), and the Two Ladies or Nebty (nbtj) name. The Golden Horus and the nomen and prenomen titles were added later.

In Egyptian society, religion was central to everyday life. One of the roles of the king was as an intermediary between the deities and the people. The king thus was deputised for the deities in a role that was both as civil and religious administrator. The king owned all of the land in Egypt, enacted laws, collected taxes, and defended Egypt from invaders as the commander-in-chief of the army. Religiously, the king officiated over religious ceremonies and chose the sites of new temples. The king was responsible for maintaining Maat (mꜣꜥt), or cosmic order, balance, and justice, and part of this included going to war when necessary to defend the country or attacking others when it was believed that this would contribute to Maat, such as to obtain resources.

During the early days prior to the unification of Upper and Lower Egypt, the Deshret or the "Red Crown", was a representation of the kingdom of Lower Egypt, while the Hedjet, the "White Crown", was worn by the kings of the kingdom of Upper Egypt. After the unification of both kingdoms into one united Egypt, the Pschent, the combination of both the red and white crowns was the official crown of kings. With time new headdresses were introduced during different dynasties such as the Khat, Nemes, Atef, Hemhem crown, and Khepresh. At times, a combination of these headdresses or crowns worn together was depicted.

Etymology 
The word pharaoh ultimately derives from the Egyptian compound , * "great house", written with the two biliteral hieroglyphs  "house" and  "column", here meaning "great" or "high". It was the title of the royal palace and was used only in larger phrases such as smr pr-ꜥꜣ "Courtier of the High House", with specific reference to the buildings of the court or palace. From the Twelfth Dynasty onward, the word appears in a wish formula "Great House, May it Live, Prosper, and be in Health", but again only with reference to the royal palace and not a person.

Sometime during the era of the New Kingdom, pharaoh became the form of address for a person who was king. The earliest confirmed instance where pr ꜥꜣ is used specifically to address the ruler is in a letter to the eighteenth dynasty king, Akhenaten (reigned c. 1353–1336 BC), that is addressed to "Great House, L, W, H, the Lord". However, there is a possibility that the title pr ꜥꜣ first might have been applied personally to Thutmose III (c. 1479–1425 BC), depending on whether an inscription on the Temple of Armant may be confirmed to refer to that king. During the Eighteenth dynasty (sixteenth to fourteenth centuries BC) the title pharaoh was employed as a reverential designation of the ruler. About the late Twenty-first Dynasty (tenth century BC), however, instead of being used alone and originally just for the palace, it began to be added to the other titles before the name of the king, and from the Twenty-Fifth Dynasty (eighth to seventh centuries BC, during the declining Third Intermediate Period) it was, at least in ordinary use, the only epithet prefixed to the royal appellative.

From the Nineteenth dynasty onward pr-ꜥꜣ on its own, was used as regularly as ḥm, "Majesty". The term, therefore, evolved from a word specifically referring to a building to a respectful designation for the ruler presiding in that building, particularly by the time of the Twenty-Second Dynasty and Twenty-third Dynasty.

The first dated appearance of the title "pharaoh" being attached to a ruler's name occurs in Year 17 of Siamun (tenth century BC) on a fragment from the Karnak Priestly Annals, a religious document. Here, an induction of an individual to the Amun priesthood is dated specifically to the reign of "Pharaoh Siamun". This new practice was continued under his successor, Psusennes II, and the subsequent kings of the twenty-second dynasty. For instance, the Large Dakhla stela is specifically dated to Year 5 of king "Pharaoh Shoshenq, beloved of Amun", whom all Egyptologists concur was Shoshenq I—the founder of the Twenty-second Dynasty—including Alan Gardiner in his original 1933 publication of this stela. Shoshenq I was the second successor of Siamun. Meanwhile, the traditional custom of referring to the sovereign as, pr-ˤ3, continued in official Egyptian narratives.

The title is reconstructed to have been pronounced  in the Late Egyptian language, from which the Greek historian Herodotus derived the name of one of the Egyptian kings, . The Qur'an likewise spells it  firʿawn with n (here, always referring to the one evil king in the Book of Exodus story, by contrast to the good king in surah Yusuf's story). The Arabic combines the original ayin from Egyptian along with the -n ending from Greek.

In English, the term was at first spelled "Pharao", but the translators of the King James Bible revived "Pharaoh" with "h" from the Hebrew. Meanwhile, in Egypt,  evolved into Sahidic Coptic  pərro and then ərro by mistaking p- as the definite article "the" (from ancient Egyptian pꜣ).

Other notable epithets are nswt, translated to "king"; ḥm, "Majesty"; jty for "monarch or sovereign"; nb for "lord"; and ḥqꜣ for "ruler".

Regalia

Scepters and staves 

Sceptres and staves were a general symbol of authority in ancient Egypt. One of the earliest royal scepters was discovered in the tomb of Khasekhemwy in Abydos. Kings were also known to carry a staff, and Anedjib is shown on stone vessels carrying a so-called mks-staff. The scepter with the longest history seems to be the heqa-sceptre, sometimes described as the shepherd's crook. The earliest examples of this piece of regalia dates to prehistoric Egypt. A scepter was found in a tomb at Abydos that dates to Naqada III.

Another scepter associated with the king is the was-sceptre. This is a long staff mounted with an animal head. The earliest known depictions of the was-scepter date to the First Dynasty. The was-scepter is shown in the hands of both kings and deities.

The flail later was closely related to the heqa-scepter (the crook and flail), but in early representations the king was also depicted solely with the flail, as shown in a late pre-dynastic knife handle that is now in the Metropolitan museum, and on the Narmer Macehead.

The Uraeus 
The earliest evidence known of the Uraeus—a rearing cobra—is from the reign of Den from the first dynasty. The cobra supposedly protected the king by spitting fire at its enemies.

Crowns and headdresses

Deshret 
The red crown of Lower Egypt, the Deshret crown, dates back to pre-dynastic times and symbolised chief ruler. A red crown has been found on a pottery shard from Naqada, and later, Narmer is shown wearing the red crown on both the Narmer Macehead and the Narmer Palette.

Hedjet 
The white crown of Upper Egypt, the Hedjet, was worn in the Predynastic Period by Scorpion II, and, later, by Narmer.

Pschent 
This is the combination of the Deshret and Hedjet crowns into a double crown, called the Pschent crown. It is first documented in the middle of the First Dynasty of Egypt. The earliest depiction may date to the reign of Djet, and is otherwise surely attested during the reign of Den.

Khat 

The khat headdress consists of a kind of "kerchief" whose end is tied similarly to a ponytail. The earliest depictions of the khat headdress comes from the reign of Den, but is not found again until the reign of Djoser.

Nemes 
The Nemes headdress dates from the time of Djoser. It is the most common type of royal headgear depicted throughout Pharaonic Egypt. Any other type of crown, apart from the Khat headdress, has been commonly depicted on top of the Nemes. The statue from his Serdab in Saqqara shows the king wearing the nemes headdress.

Atef 
Osiris is shown to wear the Atef crown, which is an elaborate Hedjet with feathers and disks. Depictions of kings wearing the Atef crown originate from the Old Kingdom.

Hemhem 
The Hemhem crown is usually depicted on top of Nemes, Pschent, or Deshret crowns. It is an ornate, triple Atef with corkscrew sheep horns and usually two uraei. The depiction of this crown begins among New Kingdom rulers during the Early Eighteenth Dynasty of Egypt.

Khepresh 

Also called the blue crown, the Khepresh crown has been depicted in art since the New Kingdom. It is often depicted being worn in battle, but it was also frequently worn during ceremonies. It used to be called a war crown by many, but modern historians refrain from defining it thus.

Physical evidence 
Egyptologist Bob Brier has noted that despite their widespread depiction in royal portraits, no ancient Egyptian crown has ever been discovered. The tomb of Tutankhamun that was discovered largely intact, contained such royal regalia as a crook and flail, but no crown was found among his funerary equipment. Diadems have been discovered. It is presumed that crowns would have been believed to have magical properties and were used in rituals. Brier's speculation is that crowns were religious or state items, so a dead king likely could not retain a crown as a personal possession. The crowns may have been passed along to the successor, much as the crowns of modern monarchies.

Titles 

During the Early Dynastic Period kings had three titles. The Horus name is the oldest and dates to the late pre-dynastic period. The Nesu Bity name was added during the First Dynasty. The Nebty name (Two Ladies) was first introduced toward the end of the First Dynasty. The Golden falcon (bik-nbw) name is not well understood. The prenomen and nomen were introduced later and are traditionally enclosed in a cartouche. By the Middle Kingdom, the official titulary of the ruler consisted of five names; Horus, Nebty, Golden Horus, nomen, and prenomen  for some rulers, only one or two of them may be known.

Horus name 
The Horus name was adopted by the king, when taking the throne. The name was written within a square frame representing the palace, named a serekh. The earliest known example of a serekh dates to the reign of king Ka, before the First Dynasty. The Horus name of several early kings expresses a relationship with Horus. Aha refers to "Horus the fighter", Djer refers to "Horus the strong", etc. Later kings express ideals of kingship in their Horus names. Khasekhemwy refers to "Horus: the two powers are at peace", while Nebra refers to "Horus, Lord of the Sun".

Nesu Bity name 
The Nesu Bity name, also known as prenomen, was one of the new developments from the reign of Den. The name would follow the glyphs for the "Sedge and the Bee". The title is usually translated as king of Upper and Lower Egypt. The nsw bity name may have been the birth name of the king. It was often the name by which kings were recorded in the later annals and king lists.

Nebty name 
The earliest example of a Nebty (Two Ladies) name comes from the reign of king Aha from the First Dynasty. The title links the king with the goddesses of Upper and Lower Egypt, Nekhbet and Wadjet. The title is preceded by the vulture (Nekhbet) and the cobra (Wadjet) standing on a basket (the neb sign).

Golden Horus 
The Golden Horus or Golden Falcon name was preceded by a falcon on a gold or nbw sign. The title may have represented the divine status of the king. The Horus associated with gold may be referring to the idea that the bodies of the deities were made of gold and the pyramids and obelisks are representations of (golden) sun-rays. The gold sign may also be a reference to Nubt, the city of Set. This would suggest that the iconography represents Horus conquering Set.

Nomen and prenomen 
The prenomen and nomen were contained in a cartouche. The prenomen often followed the King of Upper and Lower Egypt (nsw bity) or Lord of the Two Lands (nebtawy) title. The prenomen often incorporated the name of Re. The nomen often followed the title, Son of Re (sa-ra), or the title, Lord of Appearances (neb-kha).

See also 

 List of pharaohs
 Roman pharaoh
 Coronation of the pharaoh
 Curse of the pharaohs
 Egyptian chronology
 Pharaohs in the Bible

Notes

References

Bibliography 
 Shaw, Garry J. The Pharaoh, Life at Court and on Campaign, Thames and Hudson, 2012.
 Sir Alan Gardiner Egyptian Grammar: Being an Introduction to the Study of Hieroglyphs, Third Edition, Revised. London: Oxford University Press, 1964. Excursus A, pp. 71–76.
 Jan Assmann, "Der Mythos des Gottkönigs im Alten Ägypten", in Christine Schmitz und Anja Bettenworth (hg.), Menschen - Heros - Gott: Weltentwürfe und Lebensmodelle im Mythos der Vormoderne (Stuttgart, Franz Steiner Verlag, 2009), pp. 11–26.

External links 

 Digital Egypt for Universities

Ancient Egyptian titles
Heads of state
Royal titles
Noble titles
 
Positions of authority
Torah monarchs
Titles of national or ethnic leadership
Egyptian royal titles